Stark Young (October 11, 1881 – January 6, 1963) was an American teacher, playwright, novelist, painter, literary critic, translator, and essayist.

Early life
Stark Young was born on October 11, 1881 in Como, Mississippi. His father, Alfred Alexander Young, was a physician. His mother, Mary Clark Starks, was a direct descendant of the McGehees, an old planter family; she died when he was nine years old.  Shortly after her death, Young was sent to live at the McGehee Plantation in Senatobia, Mississippi.

Young entered the University of Mississippi at the age of 15 and graduated from that institution in 1901.  He completed his Master's Degree at Columbia University in New York in 1902.

Career
Young taught at the University of Mississippi in 1905-1907, and then moved to the University of Texas at Austin.  There he established the Texas Review and became involved with theater. In 1915 he moved to Amherst College in Massachusetts, where he taught English until 1921.

He resigned to pursue other interests and moved to New York City. In New York, he was appointed as an editor of Theatre Arts Magazine and as drama critic for The New Republic.  Young worked at The New Republic until his retirement in 1947. During this period he was also professionally involved with the theater in New York and wrote several plays. Young's plays include: Guenevere, Addio, Madretta, At The Shrine, The Star In The Trees, Twilight Saint, The Dead Poet, The Seven Kings and the Wind, and The Queen of Sheba, to name a few.

In 1926 Stark Young wrote his first novel Heaven Trees. In 1930, Young contributed to the agrarian manifesto, I'll Take My Stand. He was one of 12 Southern writers, a group including Allen Tate, known as the Southern Agrarians. Young drew on the traditions of his Southern upbringing for inspiration.  He wrote essays, journalistic articles, and collections of stories that drew on these sources.  He also published four novels dealing with Southern themes.

So Red the Rose (1934), perhaps Young's finest novel, had a brief period of popularity as the archetype of the Southern Civil War novel and dealt with the aftermath of the war. In 1935, his novel was adapted as a film of the same name directed by King Vidor and starring Margaret Sullavan.  Described by its author as a novel of the affections, the book is still in print. The phenomenal successes of Margaret Mitchell's Gone With the Wind (1936) and its film adaptation of 1939 pushed Young's book into the background.

Young translated a number of plays by Anton Chekhov, including The Sea Gull, Uncle Vanya, The Three Sisters, and The Cherry Orchard, all of which were published in 1956 by The Modern Library as Best Plays by Chekhov.

In the 1940s Young, a self-taught artist, began painting. He had two one-man exhibitions in New York. His paintings were shown in four important venues, including the Art Institute of Chicago, which purchased one of his works for its permanent collection.

In 1951 Young published his memoir, The Pavilion, dedicated to his friend Allen Tate.

Young was inducted into the American Theater Hall of Fame, as well as the New York University Hall of Fame. He was the recipient of Creative Arts Medallion from Brandeis University and the Southeastern Theatre Conference's Distinguished Career Award. Additionally, he received the Order of the Crown of Italy for a series of lectures on American theater. He gave them in Italian as a Westinghouse Lecturer in Italy. He served on the board of New York University and was a theater critic for the New York Times.

Death
Young suffered a stroke in May 1959 and died four years later. He was buried in Friendship Cemetery in Como, Mississippi.

References

External links
 
 Finding aid to Stark Young manuscripts at Columbia University. Rare Book & Manuscript Library.
 Stark Young Collection at the Harry Ransom Center. 

1881 births
1963 deaths
Columbia Graduate School of Arts and Sciences alumni
Amherst College faculty
Members of the American Academy of Arts and Letters
Novelists from Mississippi
20th-century American novelists
American male novelists
20th-century American painters
American male painters
American literary critics
20th-century American dramatists and playwrights
American male essayists
American male dramatists and playwrights
Writers of American Southern literature
20th-century American essayists
People from Como, Mississippi
People from Senatobia, Mississippi
20th-century American male writers
Novelists from Massachusetts
Southern Agrarians
20th-century American male artists